Lighthouse Point may refer to:
 Lighthouse Point, Florida, a city in Broward County, Florida, United States
 Lighthouse Point, Bahamas, a private peninsula in Eleuthera, Bahamas